The Church of Saint Matthew is a Church of England Grade II* listed church located in the High Elswick area of Newcastle upon Tyne, within the Georgian suburb of Summerhill

History 
Saint Matthew's was formed out of Saint John's parish in November, 1869, and the Parish is the home of four former parishes - Saint Philip (Elswick), Saint Augustine (Brighton Grove), Saint Matthew (Big Lamp), and Saint Mary the Virgin (Rye Hill).

Tradition
Saint Matthew's was founded after the foundations of the Catholic Revival had been set; with its first Vicar, Father Robert Daunt, being described by the time of his death as "a decided High Churchman, [who] had held strong views on the question of the independence of the Church in spiritual matters.".  As such, the church has, from its founding, followed the Anglo-Catholic High Church tradition — a rarity within the diocese.

References

External links

 The Parish Church of Saint Matthew
 A Church Near You: Saint Matthew's Church, Newcastle

Newcastle Upon Tyne
19th-century Church of England church buildings
Newcastle Upon Tyne